Damien Reale (born 17 May 1981) is an Irish hurler who played as a left corner-back for the Limerick senior team.

Reale made his first appearance for the team during the 2001 National League and immediately became a regular member of the starting fifteen. A three-time All-Ireland medalist in the under-21 grade, he enjoyed little success as a member of the county senior team. Reale ended up an All-Ireland runner-up on one occasion.

At club level Reale is a county intermediate championship medalist with Hospital-Herbertstown.

Playing career

Club

Reale plays is club hurling with Hospital-Herbertstown and has enjoyed much success in a lengthy career.

In 2000 he was just out of the minor grade when he won a county intermediate hurling championship medal.

A decade later Reale won a second county intermediate championship medal, as Hospital-Herbertstown triumphed once again.

Under-21

Reale first came to prominence on the inter-county scene as a member of the Limerick under-21 hurling team in 2000. After a 1-13 apiece draw with Cork in the provincial decider, Limerick went on to win the replay following a stunning 4-18 to 1-6 victory. It was Reale's first Munster medal. Limerick subsequently defeated Galway by 1-13 to 0-13 in the All-Ireland decider, giving Reale an All-Ireland Under-21 Hurling Championship medal.

In 2001 Reale added a second Munster under-21 medal to his collection as Limerick retained their provincial title following a 3-14 to 2-16 defeat of Tipperary. Limerick later went on to defeat Wexford by just a single point to retain their All-Ireland title. It was Reale's second All-Ireland medal.

Limerick's great run of success continued in 2002. That year Limerick retained the provincial title for the third successive year with Reale winning a third Munster medal following a 1-20 to 2-14 defeat of Tipperary. A subsequent 3-17 to 0-8 trouncing of Galway gave Reae a third successive All-Ireland medal.

Senior

By this stage Reale was a key member of the Limerick senior hurling team. He made his debut in a National Hurling League game against Antrim in 2001 and was later included at corner-back for the championship campaign. Reale lined out in his first Munster final at senior level that year. Tipperary were the opponents on that occasion, however, Limerick faced a narrow 2-16 to 1-17 defeat.

Limerick hurling went on to decline following this defeat and faced a number of years of early championship exits.

In 2006 Reale claimed his first silverware at senior level with Limerick. A 1-19 to 3-10 defeat of the Waterford Institute of Technology secured the Waterford Crystal Cup for Reale's side.

Reale was appointed captain of the Limerick senior hurling team in 2007. That year he lined out in a second Munster final, this time with Waterford providing the opposition. A 3-17 to 1-14 defeat was Limerick's lot on that occasion. Limerick later gained their revenge on Waterford in the All-Ireland semi-final, thus gaining qualification to a first All-Ireland decider in eleven years for the Treaty men. Kilkenny provided the opposition and got off to a flying start with Eddie Brennan and Henry Shefflin combining to score two goals within the first ten minutes. Limerick were eventually defeated on a 2–19 to 1–15 score line.

Limerick failed to build on their reasonably successful 2007 season and went into decline once again.

In November 2009 Reale announced his retirement from inter-county hurling in protest over changes made in the Limerick hurling panel by team manager Justin McCarthy. Following McCarthy's resignation as manager in 2010, Reale returned to the hurling panel.

In 2011 Reale won a National League (Division 2) medal that year following a 4-12 to 2-13 defeat of near neighbours Clare.

Following the completion of the championship in 2011, Reale announced his retirement from inter-county hurling.

Inter-provincial

Reale has also lined out with Munster in the Railway Cup inter-provincial competition.  He captured a winners medal in this competition in 2001 as Munster defeated Leinster.

Honours

Team
Hospital-Herbertstown
 Limerick Intermediate Hurling Championship (2): 2000, 2010

Limerick
 Munster Under-21 Hurling Championship (3): 2000, 2001, 2002
 All-Ireland Under-21 Hurling Championship (3): 2000, 2001, 2002
 National Hurling League (Division 2) (1): 2011
 Waterford Crystal Cup (1): 2006

Munster
 Railway Cup (1): 2001

References

Living people
1981 births
Hospital-Herbertstown hurlers
Limerick inter-county hurlers
Munster inter-provincial hurlers